Bose Corporation is an American manufacturing company that predominantly sells audio equipment. The company was established by Amar Bose in 1964 and is based in Framingham, Massachusetts. It is best known for its home audio systems and speakers, noise cancelling headphones, professional audio products and automobile sound systems. Bose has a reputation for being particularly protective of its patents, trademarks, and brands.

The majority owner of Bose Corporation is the Massachusetts Institute of Technology. Non-voting shares were donated to MIT by founder Amar Bose, and receive cash dividends. According to the company annual report for the 2021 financial year, Bose Corporation's annual sales were $3.2 billion, and the company employed approximately 7,000 people.

History

The company was founded in Massachusetts in 1964 by Amar Bose with angel investor funding, including Amar's thesis advisor and professor, Y. W. Lee. Bose's interest in speaker systems had begun in 1956 when he purchased a stereo system and was disappointed with its performance. The purpose of the company was to develop speaker systems which used multiple speakers aimed at the surrounding walls to reflect the sound and replicate the sound of a concert hall.

In 1966, the Bose 2201 was the first product sold by the company. It was an unusual design consisting of 22 speakers, with many of them facing away from the listener. The 2201 was designed to be located in the corner of a room, using reflections off the walls to increase the apparent size of the room. The 2201 was a failure in the market and was discontinued after three or four years.

After this experience, Bose came to the conclusion that the audio system measurement techniques of the time (such as measuring distortion and frequency response) were not effective ways to evaluate the goal of natural sound reproduction. Bose argued that the best measure of audio quality is the listener's perception. Also in 1968, the company introduced the Bose 901 stereo speaker system, which used eight mid-range drivers pointing towards the wall behind the speaker, and a ninth driver towards the listener. The purpose of this design was to achieve a dominance of reflected over direct sound in home listening spaces. The design used in the 901 was unconventional compared with most systems, where mid-range and high-frequency speakers directly face the listener. The 901 was an immediate commercial success, and Bose Corporation grew rapidly during the 1970s. The Bose 901 model name was a mainstay of the Bose line-up for many years, being produced from 1968 until 2016.

In 1991, a team of Bose researchers debunked a 1989 experiment that claimed to have created energy through cold fusion.

The first Bose retail store was opened in 1993 in Kittery, Maine.

In 2011, then-chairman and primary stockholder Amar Bose donated the majority of the firm's non-voting shares to his former employer and alma mater, the Massachusetts Institute of Technology. An annual cash dividend is paid out to "advance the research and education mission of MIT". However, the conditions of receiving the shares stated that MIT was not allowed to sell them, nor was MIT permitted to participate in the company's management and governance. Following Amar Bose's death in 2013, Bob Maresca became the Chief Executive Officer.

In June 2016, Bose and Flex manufacturing extended their strategic partnership. Bose operations in Malaysia and Mexico will transfer to Flex.

At the end of 2017, Maresca stepped down as CEO and Bose President Phil Hess took the position. Maresca remained Chairman of the Board.

In January 2020, Bose announced that they would be closing all their more than 100 retail stores in North America, Japan, Europe, and Australia. They will retain their online presence, as well sell their products through Target, Best Buy, and Amazon.

In late January 2020, President and COO Jim Scammon replaced Phil Hess.

In August 2020, Bose named their first female CEO, Lila Snyder, who was formerly an executive at Pitney Bowes. Snyder, who will take her position September 2020, is an MIT alumna, having earned her masters and Ph.D. degrees in mechanical engineering there.

Production facilities 
Bose's products are manufactured in the United States, Mexico, China and Malaysia. The company's factories in the United States are located in Framingham, Massachusetts (also the site of the company headquarters), Westborough, Massachusetts and Stow, Massachusetts. In early 2021, Bose Corporation notified the Town of Stow of intention to vacate the 81.5 acre Stow campus after 18 years at the site, moving nearly 1500 employees to the Framingham headquarters. The Bose factories in Mexico are located in Tijuana and San Luis Río Colorado. The Malaysian Bose factory is located in Batu Kawan and is also the company's distribution hub for the Asia-Pacific and Middle East.

In 2015, two facilities in Columbia, South Carolina and Carrickmacross, Ireland, were closed (with the loss of 300 and 140 jobs respectively), as part of a "global streamlining of Bose's supply chain. Bose used the Columbia facility, which opened in 1993, for distribution and repair, sub-manufacturing and regional manufacturing, and final assembly for some headsets. The Carrickmacross factory, which began operations in 1978, did final assembly for some home theatre systems, Wave radios, and other regional manufacturing. The operation of the San Luis and Batu Kawan factories were taken over by contract manufacturer Flex in 2016 and continued to produce Bose products.

Products

Automotive 
Following an unsuccessful attempt to sell aftermarket car speakers, Bose's first OEM audio installation was in a MY1983 Cadillac Seville. Bose has since supplied audio systems for many car manufacturers. In 2007, the Bose media system won the International Telematics Award for the "Best Storage Solution for In-Car Environment".

A prototype active suspension system, using electromagnetic motors instead of hydraulic/pneumatic power, was unveiled by the company in 2004 and was due for release in 2009, but it did not materialize due to weight and cost. The system used electromagnetic linear motors to raise or lower the wheels of an automobile in response to uneven bumps or potholes on the road. The wheels are raised when approaching a bump (or lowered into a pothole) to keep the vehicle level, using principles similar to noise cancelling audio devices. A prototype car had the ability to jump over an obstacle. The company said that the system is too expensive and heavy, even after development over more than 20 years costing $100 million of development. In November 2017, it was reported that Bose had sold the technology to ClearMotion. In May 2018, it was announced that five major car manufacturers had expressed interest in the technology and that it may be available in 2019 for low-volume vehicles and by 2020 for the mass market.

A truck seat system called Bose Ride was introduced in 2010. This active seat system aims to reduce fatigue, back pain and physical stress experienced by truck drivers by reducing vibration from the road. Bose claimed up to a 90% reduction in driver's seat vibration.

Automobile brands that currently have Bose audio systems available in their vehicles are Buick, Cadillac, Chevrolet, Fiat, GMC, Honda, Hyundai, Infiniti, Kia, Mazda, Mitsubishi, Nissan, and Porsche.

Home audio and video
Bose home audio products

Bose's product range has included:

In 2012, Bose was the highest selling company in the United States for retail home theater systems, and the third highest selling for portable audio products.

Headphones 

The company has sold aviation headsets since 1989 and consumer headphones since 2000. The current range of headphones/headsets consists of over-ear, in-ear, aviation and military models.

Bose has contracts with the U.S. military and NASA.

Commercial sound systems 
The Bose Professional division was established in 1972 to produce and install public address systems. In 2009, the division accounted for about 60% of Bose's annual revenue. Bose was the first company to pay for the title of official Olympics sound system supplier, providing audio equipment for the 1988 and 1992 Winter Olympics in Calgary and Albertville respectively. Bose's systems have not received THX certification.

The Bose L1 is a range of portable line array loudspeaker systems for musicians. The L1 was introduced in 2003 with models that have been retroactively known as the "L1 Classic" range. These products were replaced by the "L1 Model I" and "L1 Model II" in 2007. A smaller and lighter "L1 Compact" model was introduced April 2009. The L1 Model I was replaced by the "L1 Model 1S" in 2012, and the "B1 Bass Module" was replaced by the larger "B2 Bass Module".

Since the 1980s, Bose has offered 25-volt and 70-volt installed commercial audio systems for businesses.

Lack of published specifications 
The company is known for its refusal to provide specifications for its products. This policy dates back to 1968, when Amar Bose published a paper titled "On the Design, Measurement and Evaluation of Loudspeakers", wherein he rejected numerical test data in favor of subjective evaluation. In a 2007 interview, Amar stated: "There are two reasons we cut out the specifications: 1- We don’t know of any measurements that actually determine anything about a product, and 2- Measurements are phony, in general, as they are printed."

Reception
In some non-audio related publications, Bose has been cited as a producer of "high-end audio" products. Commenting in 2007 on Bose's "high-end" market positioning among audiophiles (people concerned with the best possible sound), a PC Magazine product reviewer stated "not only is Bose equipment's sound quality not up to audiophile standards, but one could buy something that does meet these stringent requirements for the same price or, often, for less." Bose has also received mixed reviews from the public. Bose has not been certified by THX for its home entertainment products even though its more expensive home theater products compete at prices where THX certification is common. Some other views include:

 Bose's flagship 901 speaker system was given a negative review by Consumer Reports in 1970 (see Bose Corp. v. Consumers Union of United States, Inc.). Stereophile magazine, in 1979, also gave a negative review, stating that the system was unexceptional and unlikely to appeal to perfectionists with a developed taste in precise imaging, detail, and timbre; and that these shortcomings were an excessive price to pay for the improvement in impact and ambience generated by the large proportion of reflected sound [to on-axis sound]. However, the author also stated that the system produced a more realistic resemblance of natural ambience than any other speaker system. A more recent positive review by TONE Audio found that the 901 was better than expected and a good value for the price range.
A 2005 market study published by Forrester Research reported that Bose's brand name was among several computer and consumer electronics brands most trusted by US consumers including Dell and Hewlett-Packard.
A 2007 review in Audioholics online magazine reiterated that Bose was very expensive for its performance. Of the Bose Lifestyle V20 Home Theater System the reviewer wrote, "The Bose system is very expensive at nearly $2,000 and the sound quality isn't really any better than many other surround systems costing a third of the price... the smaller [bass] cones cannot reproduce lower tactile [sic] frequencies." The review included an interview with a Best Buy sales manager who suggested from his experience that, despite his directing customers to a better-sounding and less expensive alternative, some customers insisted on Bose.
A July 2012 review by NBC News of the $5,000 46" Bose TV noted that the video screen, produced by Samsung, resembled most closely a $750 flat panel television, and that the technology used was not up to par with other screens in the same category. The review then questioned the value of the additional $4,250 cost for the Bose TV, suggesting there were compelling audio alternatives for less than 1/5th the price difference. The same system received a positive review by PC Magazine that cited the user interface and sound quality in an unobtrusive design.
In July 2013, iLounge wrote about the Bose Soundlink Mini, a small remote speaker competing against inexpensive, low-end audio devices, that "Audio quality is SoundLink Mini's real trump card over Jambox and most—not all—of its competitors... SoundLink Mini delivers much deeper bass and cleaner mid-bass at all volumes, suffering from noticeable distortion solely at the top of its volume scale."

Legal actions
Bose has been described by audio industry professionals as a litigious company. In 1981, Bose unsuccessfully sued the magazine Consumer Reports for libel. Consumer Reports reported in a review that the sound from the system that they reviewed "tended to wander about the room." Initially, the Federal District Court found that Consumer Reports "had published the false statement with knowledge that it was false or with reckless disregard of its truth or falsity" when it changed what the original reviewer wrote about the speakers in his pre-publication draft, that the sound tended to wander "along the wall." The Court of Appeals then reversed the trial court's ruling on liability, and the United States Supreme Court affirmed in a 6–3 vote in the case Bose Corp. v. Consumers Union of United States, Inc., finding that the statement was made without actual malice, and therefore there was no libel. In an interview decades later Amar Bose said "We had 37 people at the time. I gathered them in one room and said, 'If we don't do anything, it will probably kill us. But if we do something, we have no credibility since we're just a small company and we can't do anything against this.' I said I think we oughtta do something. I wanted a vote. It was unanimous in favor of taking action. Little did we know it would take 14 years to go through the legal process."

Bose sued Thiel Audio in the early 1990s to stop the audiophile loudspeaker maker from using ".2" at the end of its product model "CS2.2". To comply with Bose's trademark of ".2" associated with the Bose Model 2.2 product, Thiel changed their model name to "CS2 2", substituting a space for the decimal point. Bose did not trademark ".3" so in 1997 when Thiel introduced the next model in the series, they named it the "Thiel 2.3", advertising "the return of the decimal point."

In 1996, Bose sued two subsidiaries of Harman International Industries—JBL and Infinity Systems—for violating a Bose patent on elliptical tuning ports on some loudspeaker products. In 2000, the court determined that Harman was to cease using elliptical ports in its products, and Harman was to pay Bose $5.7 million in court costs. Harman stopped using the disputed port design but appealed the financial decision. At the end of 2002, the earlier judgment was upheld but by this time Bose's court expenses had risen to $8 million, all to be paid by Harman.

Bose was successful in blocking QSC Audio Products from trademarking the term "PowerWave" in connection with a certain QSC amplifier technology. In 2002, a court decided that the "Wave" trademark was worthy of greater protection because it was well-known on its own, even beyond its association with Bose.

In 2003, Bose sued Custom Electronics Design and Installation Association (CEDIA), a non-profit electronics trade organization for use of the "Electronic Lifestyles" trademark, which CEDIA had been using since 1997. Bose argued that the trademark interfered with its own "Lifestyle" trademark. Bose had previously sued to protect its "Lifestyle" trademark beginning in 1996 with a success against Motorola and continuing with settlements against New England Stereo, Lifestyle Technologies, Optoma and AMX. In May 2007, CEDIA won the lawsuit after the court determined Bose to be guilty of laches (unreasonable delays), and that Bose's assertions of fraud and likelihood of confusion were without merit. CEDIA was criticized for spending nearly $1 million of its member's money on the lawsuit, and Bose was criticized for "unsportsmanlike action against its own trade association", according to Julie Jacobson of CE Pro magazine.

In July 2014, Bose sued Beats Electronics for patent infringement, alleging that its "Studio" headphones line incorporated Bose noise cancelling technology. Bose and Apple had collaborated on the SoundDock for iPod music players in 2004. Then in May 2014, Beats was bought by Apple, bringing Bose and Apple into direct competition in the headphone market. In Apple stores, Bose headphones were once the foremost brand offered, but at the time of the lawsuit, Beats products outnumbered Bose. In 2014 total premium headphone market share, Beats held 62%, Bose held 22%. In October 2014, Bose dropped the lawsuit, as Bose and Beats settled out of court without revealing the terms. Apple removed all Bose products from its Apple stores a few days after the lawsuit was settled, but two months later, Bose products returned.

In April 2017, Bose was sued alleging a privacy violation regarding the mobile phone apps delivered by Bose to control their Bluetooth headphones.

References

External links

 

 
Audio amplifier manufacturers
Headphones manufacturers
In-car entertainment
Loudspeaker manufacturers
Manufacturing companies based in Massachusetts
Companies based in Framingham, Massachusetts
Electronics companies established in 1964
Retail companies established in 1993
American companies established in 1964
Privately held companies based in Massachusetts
Manufacturers of professional audio equipment
1964 establishments in Massachusetts